Sotonikha is a rural locality (a village) in Ilyinskoye Rural Settlement, Kharovsky District, Vologda Oblast, Russia. The population was 3 as of 2002.

Geography 
Sotonikha is located 21 km northeast of Kharovsk (the district's administrative centre) by road. Korovinskaya is the nearest rural locality.

References 

Rural localities in Kharovsky District